Pascal Dubois (born 27 October 1962) is a French former road cyclist, who was a professional from 1986 to 1990.

Major results
1985
 1st Overall Trois Jours de Cherbourg
1st Stage 4
 1st Paris–Connerré
 1st Stage 5 Tour d'Algérie
 2nd Grand Prix des Marbriers
 4th Paris–Roubaix Espoirs
1986
 8th Paris–Brussels
1987
 10th Overall Circuit Cycliste Sarthe
1988
 1st Stage 1 Tour du Poitou Charentes et de la Vienne
 5th GP de la Ville de Rennes
1989
 3rd Paris–Camembert
 7th Trofeo Laigueglia
1990
 2nd Road race, National Road Championships

References

External links

1962 births
Living people
French male cyclists
People from Amboise
Sportspeople from Indre-et-Loire
Cyclists from Centre-Val de Loire